Mitchell D. Weiss (born 1986) is an American photographer, specializing in studio and candid portraiture. Weiss' career has included editorial photography for The Boston Globe,  and art installations for corporate functions. Weiss also served as gallery director of Boston's Piano Factory.

Mitch Weiss graduated from the College of Arts, Media and Design, at Northeastern University, .

In 2012, Weiss was one of ten photographers featured in the New England Photographers Group Show at Boston's Flash Forward Festival. That same year, Weiss guest lectured at the Boston Center for Adult Education and Open Show: New York. Weiss was a semifinalist for Hasselblad's 2012 Masters series that celebrates the best in both established and rising photographic talent.

In November 2013, Humble Hues published a book titled Dogs in Thought, which features Mitch Weiss' photographs; benefits went to the MSPCA-Angell and the Animal Rescue League of Boston.

In late 2011, Weiss submitted a 2008 portrait he had taken of Lady Gaga, for auction by ARTcetera on behalf of Boston's AIDS Action Committee. Weiss was interviewed about the photo in the January 2012 issue of e-magazine In Classic Style.

Select exhibitions
2011 Rock and Roll – Boston, Griffin Museum of Photography
2012 Content Dictates Form - Boston, Gallery at the Piano Factory
2012 Flash Forward Festival – Boston
2013 Inaugural Exhibition – Los Angeles, Moskowitz Gallery
2013 Sister Cities – Boston, Gallery 360

Book contributions
Dogs in Thought by Mitch Weiss –   Humble Hues
Designing a Digital Portfolio: Second Edition by Cynthia L. Baron – Pg No. 36  New Riders
Adobe Photoshop Forensics by Cynthia L. Baron – Pg No. 327-336  Thomson
Graphic Design Essentials by Joyce Walsh Macario – Pg No. 124  Pearson Prentice Hall
100 Boston Painters by Chawky Frenn – Pg No. 80   Schiffer Publishing, Ltd.

References

1986 births
Photographers from New York City
Northeastern University alumni
Living people
Artists from Boston
Fine art photographers